Eureka station was a station on the Great Northern Railway's Empire Builder in Eureka, Montana. It closed in 1970 when Lake Koocanusa was made, flooding The Kootenai River as well as Rexford, MT, where the lines used to run from Eureka to Libby. Around Stryker, the Flathead Tunnel was constructed to bypass Eureka and go to Libby.

Today
The tracks are still in use in Eureka as part of the Mission Mountain Railroad. They operate as a branch line to Whitefish and the Flathead Tunnel but are mostly used to transport lumber and other goods to and from Eureka. The tracks that were in Old Rexford are still there, underwater in Lake Koocanusa.

Notes

Former Great Northern Railway (U.S.) stations
Railway stations closed in 1970
Former railway stations in Montana
Buildings and structures in Lincoln County, Montana
1970 disestablishments in Montana